Elisha N'Dow (born 13 October 1996) is an English professional footballer who plays as a centre back for Charlton Athletic on loan from FA Women's Super League club Aston Villa. She represented Aston Villa on more than 100 occasions and served as their captain.

Career statistics

Club

Notes

References

1996 births
Living people
English women's footballers
Women's association football central defenders
Aston Villa W.F.C. players
Women's Championship (England) players
Women's Super League players
England women's youth international footballers
Black British sportswomen
English people of Gambian descent
English sportspeople of African descent